Ostrovskoye is a rural locality (a settlement) and the administrative center of Ostrovsky District, Kostroma Oblast, Russia. Population:

References

Notes

Sources

Rural localities in Kostroma Oblast
Ostrovsky District, Kostroma Oblast
Kineshemsky Uyezd